Operation Charioteer was a series of 16 nuclear tests conducted by the United States in 1985–1986 at the Nevada Test Site. These tests followed the Operation Grenadier series and preceded the Operation Musketeer series.

References

Explosions in 1985
Explosions in 1986
1985 in military history
1986 in military history
Charioteer